"Long Live the Chief" is a song recorded by American rapper Jidenna. It was released on December 21, 2015 by Wondaland Records and Epic Records as the lead single from his debut studio album, The Chief (2017). The track was produced by Best Kept Secret.

Music video
The song's accompanying music video premiered on December 10, 2015, on Jidenna's YouTube account. The music video was directed by Benny Boom.

Live performances
On October 13, 2016, Jidenna performed the song on The Daily Show.

A performance of "Long Live The Chief" was presented as a sound check during the opening of S01E05 of Luke Cage.

Track listing

Charts

References

External links

2015 singles
2015 songs
Epic Records singles
Jidenna songs